Serviola (P-71) is the lead ship of the s of the Spanish Navy built in 1990. The ship has been involved in numerous anti-piracy and drug interdiction missions off the coast of Spain and in the Gulf of Guinea.

Description 
In December 2021, the Spanish Navy announced that 12.7 mm "Guardian 30" naval weapons station would be installed aboard Serviola and several other patrol boats and frigates by the domestic company Escribano.

History 
In April 2019, Serviola detected an in-progress hijacking of a Nigerian merchant vessel by pirates. Upon the Serviolas approach the pirates fled, but they had been able to steal small valuables from the crew. In May, Serviola was dispatched by Spanish authorities alongside a frigate from Equatorial Guinea to conduct an anti-piracy operation aboard the hijacked heavy-lift ship . The Blue Marlin had been boarded by seven pirates using a zodiac boat on 5 May after unloading its cargo in the territorial waters of Equatorial Guinea. Serviola approached the Blue Marlin and seven embarked Spanish Marines boarded the vessel. They found that the pirates had left the crew unharmed, but had severely damaged the pilothouse before leaving. Serviola left the vicinity after it was arranged for a tug to assist Blue Marlin into safe harbor. Serviola continued to operate in the Gulf of Guinea as an anti-piracy ship through the rest of 2019 and into 2020.

In February 2021, Serviola was part of a drug interdiction mission in the Bay of Biscay. She intercepted the small bunkering tanker  which was smuggling drugs off the Galician coast, sending a team from the National Police to board the ship. However, the smugglers had begun to scuttle their ship in order to prevent evidence of the drugs they were ferrying from falling into the hands of authorities.

Serviola was involved in a minor incident between Spain and the United Kingdom in July 2020, when she transited through the territorial waters of Gibraltar for roughly 45 minutes before being escorted out by the Royal Navy vessel . The intrusion into their territorial waters drew criticism from several British maritime officials, who speculated that it was in response to newly imposed quarantine measures due to the COVID-19 pandemic.

In May 2022, Serviola brought the Spanish Ambassador to Côte d'Ivoire, Rafael Ortiz, to the port city of Abidjan on a diplomatic mission. The ship was presented to Ivorian officials in an effort to improve bilateral relations between the two countries' navies to combat piracy in the region.

References 

Patrol vessels of the Spanish Navy
Ships built in Spain
1990 ships